Cruz Bay, U.S. Virgin Islands is the main town on the island of Saint John in the United States Virgin Islands. According to the 2000 census, Cruz Bay had a population of 2,743.

Community

Cruz Bay, located on the west coast of Saint John, is the island's largest commercial center and the location of the main port on Saint John.  The primary access to Saint John is through Cruz Bay Harbor.  Frequent barge and ferry, including car ferry, service connects Saint John to the neighboring more-developed island of Saint Thomas.  Ferries also run regularly between Cruz Bay and Tortola, Virgin Gorda, and Jost Van Dyke in the British Virgin Islands.

Cruz Bay is home to numerous shops and restaurants which are frequented by tourists and locals alike.  The Virgin Islands National Park Visitor Center, the Elaine Sprauve Library, and a United States Post Office are also located in Cruz Bay.

Cruz Bay beach is lined with beach bars and shops. There is also a casino. The beach has soft white sand, a designated swimming area, and space for day boaters to anchor.

The National Park Service has its headquarters near the waterfront in Cruz Bay as does U.S. Customs and Immigration.

The Cruz Bay Town Historic District was listed on the U.S. National Register of Historic Places in 2016.

Climate 
According to the Köppen Climate Classification system, Cruz Bay has a tropical monsoon climate, abbreviated "Am" on climate maps.

Gallery

References

External links
Cruz Bay Visitor Center – Official site

Populated places in Saint John, U.S. Virgin Islands
National Register of Historic Places in the United States Virgin Islands
Towns in the United States Virgin Islands
Sub-districts of Saint John, U.S. Virgin Islands